Paliepiai is a village in Lithuania located 6 km east of Viduklė. According to the 2001 census, it had 518 residents.

References

Villages in Kaunas County